Infanta Beatrice of Coimbra (1435–1462) was the fifth child of Infante Peter, Duke of Coimbra, and Isabella of Urgell.

After the Battle of Alfarrobeira, where her father's army was defeated by the Portuguese royal army, she left the country  and took refuge in Burgundy, under her aunt’s protection: Isabella of Portugal was married to Duke Philip III the Good.

In 1453, Beatrice married Adolph of Cleves, Lord of Ravenstein, nephew of the Duke Philip III the Good. They had issue:

 Philip of Cleves (1456—1528)
 Louise (1457—1458)

She died in Bruges of suspected poisoning in 1462.

Ancestry

References
"Nobreza de Portugal e Brasil", Vol. I, page 271. Published by Zairol Lda., Lisbon, 1989

External links
 Genealogical information on Infanta Beatrice of Coimbra (in Portuguese)

1435 births
1462 deaths
15th-century Portuguese people
House of Aviz
15th-century Portuguese women